Calderbrook is a village within the Metropolitan Borough of Rochdale, in Greater Manchester, England.

It was originally part of the township of Blatchinworth and Calderbrook within the ancient parish of Rochdale, becoming a separate civil parish in 1866.  The civil parish was abolished in 1894, when it became part of Littleborough urban district.

See also

Listed buildings in Littleborough, Greater Manchester

References

Villages in Greater Manchester